Bunnik is a railway station located in Bunnik, Netherlands. The station was opened in 1868 and is located on the Amsterdam–Arnhem railway. The station is operated by Nederlandse Spoorwegen. The station was closed between 15 May 1938 and 28 May 1972. When it re-opened in 1972 it was moved about 1 km further west than originally.

Train service
The following services currently call at Bunnik:
2x per hour local service (sprinter) Amsterdam - Utrecht - Rhenen
2x per hour local service (sprinter) Breukelen - Utrecht - Veenendaal Centrum

Platforms

Platform 1 - Utrecht, Breukelen
Platform 2 - Veenendaal, Rhenen

External links
NS website 
Dutch Public Transport journey planner 

Railway stations in Utrecht (province)
Railway stations opened in 1868
Railway stations on the Rhijnspoorweg
Bunnik